Steven P. Cass is a retired warrant officer 1 of the Royal Navy. From 2013 to 2017, he was the Warrant Officer of the Naval Service (now Warrant Officer of the Royal Navy) and, therefore, the most senior rating of the Royal Navy. He is the first person from the Fleet Air Arm and the second person overall to hold the appointment.

Early life
Cass is from Porthleven, Cornwall. He was educated at Helston Community College, a comprehensive school in Helston, Cornwall. He left school at 17 to join the Royal Navy.

Military career
In 1986, Cass joined the Fleet Air Arm of the Royal Navy as an air engineering mechanic second class. He spent his early years with 820 Naval Air Squadron based at RNAS Culdrose. In 1988, he undertook a six-month tour of the Far East on board . He completed the artificer course in 1991. In 1994, he was serving with 771 Naval Air Squadron.

In 2005, Cass was promoted to warrant officer 2 and appointed senior maintenance rating of 700M Naval Air Squadron. In 2008, he was promoted to the rank of warrant officer 1. From 2009 to 2011, he was attached to AgustaWestland as the "structural integrity engineering authority responsible for the safety and airworthiness of all Merlin’s across the MOD and around the world". From 2011 to 2013, he served as base warrant officer of RNAS Culdrose. During this time, he was also President of the station's warrant officers' and senior rates' mess.

In July 2013, Cass was awarded the Meritorious Service Medal, receiving it from Vice Admiral David Steel in a ceremony in September. In December 2013, he was appointed Warrant Officer of the Naval Service.

References

Living people
Royal Navy sailors
Sailors from Cornwall
People from Porthleven
Warrant Officers to the Royal Navy
Year of birth missing (living people)